Eunidia brunneopunctata is a species of beetle in the family Cerambycidae. It was described by Per Olof Christopher Aurivillius in 1911. It is known from South Africa, Malawi, Angola, Kenya, Ethiopia, Mozambique, Botswana, Sudan, Namibia, Senegal, the Democratic Republic of the Congo, Tanzania, Somalia, and Uganda.

Subspecies
 Eunidia brunneopunctata bouyeri Téocchi, Jiroux & Sudre, 2007
 Eunidia brunneopunctata brunneopunctata Aurivillius, 1911
 Eunidia brunneopunctata strigatoides Breuning, 1939

References

Eunidiini
Beetles described in 1911